Niki Vasilakis is an Australian violinist. Together with the Tasmanian Symphony Orchestra, conducted by Sebastian Lang-Lessing, Vasilakis was nominated for the 2006 ARIA Award for Best Classical Album for the album Mendelssohn, Bruch, Ravel.

Vasilakis featured in the 2007 film 4 playing Summer from Vivaldi's The Four Seasons. She presented the TV series Classical Destinations on SBS. She was named Young South Australian of the Year in 2008 and the state's nominee for Young Australian of the Year.

Vasilakis is of Greek heritage, and her family originates on the island of Ikaria.

Discography

Albums

Awards and nominations

ARIA Music Awards
The ARIA Music Awards is an annual awards ceremony that recognises excellence, innovation, and achievement across all genres of Australian music. They commenced in 1987. 

! 
|-
| 2006 
| Mendelssohn, Bruch, Ravel (with Tasmanian Symphony Orchestra & Sebastian Lang-Lessing)
| Best Classical Album
| 
| 
|-

References

External links
Niki Vasilakis

Living people
Australian musicians
Year of birth missing (living people)
People educated at Immanuel College, Adelaide